Ray Barry (born 1972) is a hurling goalkeeper who plays with Passage GAA at club level and formerly with Waterford GAA at inter-county level.

Hurling career
Ray is considered as one of Waterford GAA's most skillful and entertaining goalkeeper from 1993 to 1997, he failed to hold place in the team after 1997 after a training ground incident with manager Gerald McCarthy, losing his place in goal to Ray Whity who was subsequently substituted in the opening championship fixture with Limerick by Brendan Landers.  Ray was in goal for Waterfords All-Ireland Under 21 Hurling Championship winning team in 1992.

Ray was invited back onto the Waterford panel in 2002. In a challenge match he did one of his trademark clearances where he cleared a ball after chipping it over the opposing full forwards head. Majestic as this piece of skill looked he suffered the wrath of Justin McCarthy afterwards who claimed that such play could lead to critical errors on the field. Ray never played again for Waterford, citing the fact that he was more of an entertainer than a goalkeeper.

In 2008 Ray Barry took Clongeen of Wexford to a county final which against all the odds, won. They then to contest the Leinster Junior Hurling Final, his team suffering an agonising defeat at the hands of a swarthy Tullagher-Rosbercon of Kilkenny. This team featured the likes of future All Ireland winners Walter Walsh and Paddy Hartley. . .

Honours
 All-Ireland Under 21 Hurling Championship winner - 1992
 Munster Under-21 Hurling Championship winner - 1992
 Waterford Intermediate Hurling Championship winner - 2007
 Waterford Senior Hurling Championship runner-up - 1993, 1994 and 1997

Championship Appearances

References

1972 births
Living people
Waterford inter-county hurlers
Passage (Waterford) hurlers
Hurling goalkeepers